Alamanda is a village panchayat in Jami mandal of Vizianagaram district, Andhra Pradesh, India. There is a railway station in Alamanda in Waltair division of East Coast Railway, Indian Railways.

Demographics
 census, the village demographics are as follows:
 Total Population - 6,563 in 1,397 households.
 Male Population - 3,346
 Female Population - 3,217
 Children under 6 years of age - 750 (Boys - 375 and Girls - 375)
 Total Literates - 2,967

Popular Culture
Alamanda Railway station was shown in the movie Narasimha NaiDu.

References

Villages in Vizianagaram district